Piergianni Farina (born 1 June 1959 in Bassano del Grappa) is a former Italian rugby union player who played as flanker and number 8.

Biography
Coming from Rugby Bassano, Farina later moved to Padua, playing for Petrarca Rugby.

With the Paduan team, Farina became Italian champion for four consecutive seasons.

He played three matches with the Italy national team: debuting in the 1985-87 FIRA Trophy against France A1, he was among the starting members in two 1987 Rugby World Cup matches: against New Zealand and Fiji, in the former as flanker and in the latter, as number eight.

Notes

Bibliography
Various Authors, Attimi senza tempo. Bassano del Grappa, Editrice Artistica Bassano 2001 (biographic traits of sportspeople from Veneto).

External links

1959 births
Living people
People from Bassano del Grappa
Italian rugby union players
Italy international rugby union players
Rugby union flankers
Rugby union number eights
Sportspeople from the Province of Vicenza